Angela Martinez (born January 9, 1971) is an American radio personality, rapper, singer, and actress. Nicknamed "The Voice of New York" during her two-decade tenure at New York City station HOT 97 (WQHT), she left that position in 2014 to join crosstown competitor Power 105.1 (WWPR).  Martinez won the National Association of Broadcasters (NAB) Marconi Radio Award for "Major Market Personality of the Year" in 2018, and was inducted into the Radio Hall of Fame in 2020.

Radio career
Martinez got her first break in FM broadcasting at the age of 16 answering hot lines at the urban radio station WQHT ("Hot 97"). There she met popular DJ Funkmaster Flex, and began working as his protégé. Martinez quickly picked up on the craft of running a successful radio program. She hosted the Afternoon Drive weekdays, alongside HOT 97's DJ Enuff, where she interviewed the biggest names in music such as Jay-Z and Mariah Carey. She resigned from Hot 97 on June 18, 2014. She was announced to have signed on with Hot 97's main New York radio competitor, Power 105.1 (WWPR-FM) on June 19, 2014.

Acting
As an actress, Martinez received small roles in independent hip hop films such as Blood Is Thicker Than Water and Paper Soldiers. She then appeared in Brown Sugar starring Taye Diggs, Queen Latifah and Sanaa Lathan. In October 2002, Martinez appeared in Paid In Full. More recently, she appeared in Video Girl in 2011, Generation Um... in 2012, and in the docu-comedy television series This Is Hot 97 in 2014.

Music career
In 1996, Martinez was encouraged to give rapping a shot by friend KRS-One. She appeared on his track "Heartbeat" from his 1997 album I Got Next. After the song gained a strong fan following, another friend, Lil' Kim, offered her a spot on the "Ladies Night Remix" of her song "Not Tonight" for the Nothing to Lose soundtrack. Along with Missy Elliott, Lisa "Left Eye" Lopes and Da Brat, the ladies enjoyed one of the most successful singles of 1997. It peaked on the Billboard Hot 100 chart at No. 6, and reached No. 3 on the Hip-Hop / R&B charts. The single sold over 1,000,000 copies and was certified Platinum. The ladies were nominated for two Grammy Awards that year, and were also invited to perform the song live on the MTV Video Music Awards.

A major label battle began to sign Martinez to a recording contract. Her appearance on other rapper's material was in high demand. She recorded songs with Mary J. Blige ("Christmas in the City"), Cuban Link ("Freak Out"), N.O.R.E. ("Oh No Remix"), Beenie Man ("Tell Me Remix") and Funkmaster Flex & Big Kap's compilation album The Tunnel ("Wow"). She also recorded interludes for mixtapes by Kid Capri, DJ Clue and DJ Kayslay. In 2001, she appeared in the music video for Jay-Z and R. Kelly's "Guilty Until Proven Innocent".

On April 17, 2001, she released her delayed debut album, Up Close and Personal. The album included production by DJ Clue, Salaam Remi, Knobody and Rockwilder among others, and featured guest appearances by Jay-Z, Snoop Doggy Dogg, Mary J. Blige, Wyclef Jean, Busta Rhymes and Kool G. Rap. The first single, "Dem Thangzzz" was produced by The Neptunes, and also featured background vocals by Pharrell Williams and Q-Tip. The album debuted at No. 32 on the Billboard 200 Albums Chart, and No. 7 on the Billboard Top R&B/Hip-Hop Album Chart selling 69,000 its first week. The second single, "Coast 2 Coast" (Suavamente) featuring rapper Wyclef Jean re-sparked interest in the album. She promoted the album with magazine posters, in-store signings, club appearances and television appearances with MTV and BET.

Following her first album's release, Angie began work on a second record, 2002's Animal House. In order to build anticipation for the record, she appeared on BET's Rap City and began a nationwide radio tour. She recorded a verse for the remix to her artist Sacario record "Live Big". It became the number one record in the tri-state area and coincidentally coincided with the release of Martinez's first single from her second album, "If I Could Go" which also featured Sacario and singer Lil' Mo. "If I Could Go" became a huge crossover hit on pop radio, climbing into the top 20 on The Billboard Hot 100 Chart. It became the No. 1 played on urban radio in 2002. The album, Animal House (named after Martinez's own production company and recording posse), was released on August 21, 2002. It entered the Billboard Hot 200 Albums Chart at No. 11, and the Billboard Hot Hip-Hop / R&B Charts selling 92,000 units in its first week. The follow-up single, "Take You Home" featuring R&B singer Kelis became a minor hit reaching the top 100 on the Billboard Hot 100. The album was more strongly received by critics and fans. Following the release of the album, she was featured on a remix for labelmate Lil' Mo's track "Gangster", and Nina Sky's hype single "Time to Go". Following this she announced she was retiring from the recording industry to concentrate on her other projects.

In 2002, Martinez was hired to be a judge on the second season of American Idol, but quit after a few days of auditions, citing discomfort with crushing the dreams of auditioners.

In November 2014, Martinez was signed to Jay-Z's Roc Nation.

Personal life
Martinez's father is Puerto Rican and her mother is of  Puerto Rican, Cuban and Dominican descent. She has a son born in 2003 with Tamir "Nokio" Ruffin of Dru Hill.

In 2014, Martinez ran the 2014 New York City Marathon in support of CC Sabathia's charity, the PitCCh In Foundation.

In late 2019, it was revealed that she had sustained major injuries, including a fractured lumbar and shattered vertebrae, in a serious car accident.

Awards and nominations
Radio Hall of Fame
2020 inductee
NAB Marconi Radio Awards
2018, Major Market Personality of the Year
BET Awards
 2002, Best Female Hip-Hop Artist (nominated)
 Grammy Awards
 1998, Best Rap Performance by a Duo or Group "Not Tonight" (nominated)

Discography

Studio albums

Singles

See also
 Dominican American
 Mami (hip hop)
 Nuyorican
 Puerto Ricans in New York City

References

External links

 Angie Martinez's official website (archived)
 Angie Martinez's page at Hot97.com (archived)
 Angie Martinez on YouTube
 

1971 births
Living people
Actresses from New York City
American female models
American women singers
American film actresses
American actresses of Puerto Rican descent
American people of Dominican Republic descent
American people of Cuban descent
American radio personalities
American women rappers
Elektra Records artists
Hispanic and Latino American rappers
Musicians from Brooklyn
People from the Bronx
Rappers from Brooklyn
John Dewey High School alumni
Cuban women rappers
21st-century American rappers
21st-century American women musicians
21st-century women rappers